The Allen House located about  southeast of Keachi in DeSoto Parish, Louisiana, was built in about 1848.  It was listed on the National Register of Historic Places on July 28, 1988.

It is unusual as being both a Greek Revival-styled house and a dogtrot house.  It was built in Caddo Parish.  It was moved in 1969 about 10 miles to its present location.

See also
National Register of Historic Places listings in DeSoto Parish, Louisiana

References

Houses on the National Register of Historic Places in Louisiana
Greek Revival architecture in Louisiana
Houses completed in 1848
DeSoto Parish, Louisiana